Lying is strongly discouraged and forbidden by most interpretations of Christianity. Arguments for this are based on various biblical passages, especially "thou shalt not bear false witness against thy neighbour", one of the Ten Commandments. Christian theologians disagree as to the exact definition of "lie" and whether it is ever acceptable.

Biblical passages 
One of the Ten Commandments is "thou shalt not bear false witness against thy neighbour"; for this reason, lying is generally considered a sin in Christianity. The story of Naboth in 1 Kings 21 provides an example where false witness leads to an unjust outcome. The exact
interpretation of the commandment is disputed: "Does  the commandment  pertain  only  to court  or  does  it  prohibit  lying  in  general? Is  it  only  a  prohibition  (not  to  lie  in  court,  not  ever  to  lie)   or  does  it  imply  a  positive  injunction   (truth-telling  in  court,   truth-telling  in  general)? Other statements in the Bible express a negative view of lying, such as "You shall not steal, nor deal falsely, nor lie to one another" (Leviticus 19:11) and "Cursed is he who does the work of the Lord deceitfully" (Jeremiah 48:10).

In the Hebrew Bible, those who practice lying and deceit are seemingly rewarded for their actions, posing problems for an exegesis that upholds a categorical prohibition. Examples include the Hebrew midwives who lie after Pharaoh commands them to kill all newborn boys (Exodus 1:17–21), and Rahab (Joshua 2:1–7; cf. Hebrews 11:31), an innkeeper who lies to soldiers while hiding spies in her inn. The midwives appear to be rewarded for their actions (God "dealt well with the midwives” and "gave them families"). James 2:25 appears to praise Rahab as an example of good works: "And in the same way was not also Rahab the prostitute justified by works when she received the messengers and sent them out by another way?" In the Book of Judith, Judith deceives Holofernes in order to assassinate him. Both Abraham and Isaac claimed that their wives were their sisters.

Patristic views
Augustine devoted much attention to lying, which he contended was always wrong. He discussed the topic in four works (De magistro, De doctrina christiana, De trinitate, and Enchiridion) and wrote two treatises, De mendacio and Contra mendacium, specifically on the subject of lies. According to Augustine, only four types of falsehood were not lies, because there was no desire to  deceive: explanation of someone else's viewpoint, repetition of memorized words, a slip of the tongue, or misspeaking. Augustine distinguished different situations of lying by blameworthiness, but argued that every lie was a sin. The consensus among scholars is that Augustine did not accept any lies as necessary or justified, even to save an innocent life.

However, there was an equally strong patristic tradition that defended lying for a worthwhile cause and considered it necessary or even righteous in some cases. Exponents of this view include Pseudo-Maximus,  Clement of Alexandria,  Origen, Hilary of Poitiers,  John Cassian,  John Chrysostom,  Dorotheus of Gaza,  Palladius of Antioch,  John Climacus,  and  Paulinus of Nola. This second patristic tradition was summarized by Ambrose of Milan, whose argument, based on scripture, held that Judith's action was meritorious because "she undertook for religion, not  love... she  served  religion... and  the  fatherland".

Later views
Notable Christian theologians who argued that lying was never permissible for Christians include Thomas Aquinas and John Calvin. Both Augustine and Aquinas held that it was always possible to take a correct and blameless action in any circumstance. Defenders of lying in some cases, such as Cassian and H. Tristram Engelhardt, tended to hold the opposite view: that sometimes true moral dilemmas arise.

In the twentieth century, Dietrich Bonhoeffer and Reinhold Niebuhr also took a non-absolutist position. In Ethics, Bonhoeffer discusses Kantian ethics and contests the Kantian view of lying, because "Treating truthfulness as a principle leads Kant to the grotesque conclusion that if asked by a murderer whether my friend, whom he was pursuing, had sought refuge in my house, I would have to answer honestly in the affirmative." Although he maintained that one should lie to save his friend in that situation, Bonhoeffer argued that either option incurred guilt. In a later essay, “What Does It Mean to Tell the Truth?”, Bonhoeffer argued that "Lying … is and ought to be understood as something plainly condemnable" and that it did not always incur guilt.

Professor Allen Verhey argued that lying is not always wrong, because "We live the truth not for its own sake, but for God's sake and for the neighbor's sake." The Catechism of the Catholic Church states that lying is always wrong. Different definitions of lying exist, such that Christians do not agree that all deception counts as "lying".
Catholic writer and new natural law philosopher Christopher Tollefsen has also argued that lying is never permissible for Christians. In a review of Tollefsen's book, John Skalko stated that this is an unpopular and widely criticized view.

Public opinion
According to a 2016 Pew Research Center survey, 67% of Christians in the United States, including 81% of those who defined themselves as "highly religious", agreed that "Being honest at all times" was "essential" to their Christian identity. According to the 2014 Pew Religious Landscape study in the US, the Christian group that had the highest rate of telling white lies were Black Protestants.

See also
 Jewish views on lying
 Taqiya

References

Sources

Further reading
 Articles about lying in Christianity Today

Christian ethics
Lying